Gabriele Procida (born 1 June 2002) is an Italian professional basketball player for the Alba Berlin of the Basketball Bundesliga and EuroLeague. He previously played for Fortitudo Bologna of the Italian Lega Basket Serie A (LBA).

Early life and youth career
Procida grew up playing basketball for Pallacanestro Cantù at the youth level. He competed for the youth teams of Stella Azzurra and Virtus Bologna at the Next Generation Tournament.

Professional career
On 13 October 2019, at age 17, Procida made his professional debut for Pallacanestro Cantù in a Lega Basket Serie A (LBA) game against Reyer Venezia. On 19 June 2020, he signed a four-year contract with Cantù. On 24 January 2021, Procida scored 24 points in a 107–83 loss to VL Pesaro. At 18 years, seven months and 23 days of age, he became the third-youngest player in league history to score at least 24 points in a game, behind Luigi Datome and Carlos Delfino.

On 30 May 2021, Procida declared for the 2021 NBA Draft. On 7 July he left Cantù, after the club was relegated to Serie A2, and signed a multi-year contract with Fortitudo Bologna.

In May 2022, Procida declared for the NBA Draft for the second year in a row. During the event itself, on 23 June 2022, he was subsequently selected by Portland Trail Blazers as their second-round pick and the 36th pick of the night overall, before being immediately traded to Detroit Pistons.

On 8 July 2022 he signed with Alba Berlin of the Basketball Bundesliga.

National team career
Procida represented Italy at the 2018 FIBA U16 European Championship in Serbia, averaging 10.1 points and 2.9 rebounds per game. He averaged 13.1 points, 4.6 rebounds and 2.3 assists per game for Italy at the 2019 FIBA U18 European Championship in Greece.

On 19 February 2021, Procida made his Italian senior national team debut, playing five minutes against Estonia during EuroBasket 2022 qualification.

References

External links

 Pallacanestro Cantù bio

2002 births
Living people
Alba Berlin players
Fortitudo Pallacanestro Bologna players
Italian men's basketball players
Pallacanestro Cantù players
Portland Trail Blazers draft picks
Shooting guards
Small forwards
Sportspeople from Como